Ioniță is a Romanian surname and given name. Notable people with the name include:

Alexandru Ioniță (footballer, born 1989), Romanian footballer
Alexandru Ioniță (footballer, born 1994), Romanian footballer
Anamaria Ioniță (born 1988), Romanian athlete
Andrei Ioniță (born 1994), Romanian cellist
Artur Ioniță (born 1990), Moldovan footballer
Costi Ioniță (born 1978), Romanian singer, songwriter and record producer
Ion Ioniță (ice hockey) (born 1951), Romanian ice hockey player
Ioniță Cuza (ca. 1715–1778), Moldavian statesman and political conspirator
Ioniță Sandu Sturdza (or Ioan Sturdza; 1762–1842), a Prince of Moldavia
Raluca Ioniță (born 1976), Romanian sprint canoer
Veaceslav Ioniță (born 1973) Moldovan economist and politician
Victor Ioniță (born 1983), Romanian tennis player

Other uses
Pârâul Ioniță, a tributary of the river Dornișoara in Romania
USS Ionita (SP-388), a yacht acquired by the U.S. Navy during World War I

Romanian-language surnames